The  was a class of submarine in the Imperial Japanese Navy (IJN) which served during World War II. The Type-B submarines were similar to the Type-A apart from not having the headquarters installation.

Class variants
The Type-B submarines were divided into four classes:
 
 
 
 . The 5115th vessel-class submarines were not built and remained a design only.

Type-B (I-15 class)

Project number S37. Twenty boats were built between 1937 and 1944 under the Maru 3 Programme (Boats  37 - 42) and Maru 4 Programme (Boats  139 - 152).

Type-B Mod.1 (I-40 class)

Project number S37B. Six boats were planned under the Maru Kyū Programme (Boats  370 - 375), all boats were completed. On the outside this class looked the same as the I-15 class; however, they were built from high-tensile strength steel and equipped with diesel engines of a simpler design.

Type-B Mod.2 (I-54 class)

Project number S37C. Twenty-one boats were planned under the Maru Kyū Programme (Boats  627 - 636) and Kai-Maru 5 Programme (Boats  5101 - 5114).

Boats in class

V22A Type
Project number S49A. Eighteen boats were planned under the Kai-Maru 5 Programme (Boats 5115 - 5132).

Boats in class

Characteristics

References

Notes

Bibliography

 , History of Pacific War Vol.17 I-Gō Submarines, Gakken (Japan), January 1998, 
 Rekishi Gunzō, History of Pacific War Vol.35 Kō-hyōteki and Kōryū, Gakken (Japan), April 2002, 
 Rekishi Gunzō, History of Pacific War Vol.36 Kairyū and Kaiten, Gakken (Japan), May 2002, 
 Rekishi Gunzō, History of Pacific War Extra, "Perfect guide, The submarines of the Imperial Japanese Forces", Gakken (Japan), March 2005, 
 Model Art Extra No.537, Drawings of Imperial Japanese Naval Vessels Part-3, Model Art Co. Ltd. (Japan), May 1999, Book code 08734-5
 The Maru Special, Japanese Naval Vessels No.31 Japanese Submarines I, Ushio Shobō (Japan), September 1979, Book code 68343-31

Submarine classes
 
Submarines of the Imperial Japanese Navy